The Gjuricaj Basilica ( or Bazilika e Gjuricajt) is a Cultural Monument of Albania, located in the village Gjuricaj, Durrës municipality.

The basilica dates to the 5th to 6th century and was discovered in 1980. There are still no signs along nearby roads indicating its presence.

References

Cultural Monuments of Albania
Buildings and structures in Durrës
Churches in Albania